The men's combined competition of the Beijing 2022 Olympics was held on 10 February, on "Rock" and "Ice River" courses at the Yanqing National Alpine Ski Centre in Yanqing District. Johannes Strolz of Austria became the champion, winning the first Olympic medal. Aleksander Aamodt Kilde of Norway won the silver medal. James Crawford won bronze, also his first Olympic medal.

The 2018 champion, Marcel Hirscher, retired from competitions. The silver medalist, Alexis Pinturault, qualified for the Olympics, and the bronze medalist, Victor Muffat-Jeandet, did not qualify. Marco Schwarz was the 2021 world champion, with Pinturault and Loïc Meillard being the silver and bronze medalists, respectively.

Kilde won the downhill part, and Crawford was second, but they only posted the sixth and seventh results in slalom, respectively. Strolz, who was the fourth in the downhill, won the slalom, and this was good enough for the gold medal.

Barnabás Szőllős' 6th placed finish equaled the best ever result by an Israeli at the Winter Olympics.

Schedule

Qualification

Results
Results were as follows:

References

Men's alpine skiing at the 2022 Winter Olympics